Stranger in the House may refer to:

Stranger in the House (1967 film), a British crime film
Stranger in the House (1992 film), a French crime drama
Stranger in the House (1997 film), a thriller remake of the above
Black Christmas (1974 film), retitled Stranger in the House for television screenings
"Stranger in the House" (song), duet by Elvis Costello and George Jones
Stranger in the House: The Collected Short Supernatural Fiction, Volume One , a 2010 short story collection by Lisa Tuttle
A Stranger in the House, a 2017 novel by Shari Lapena

See also
 The Strangers in the House, a 1940 novel by Belgian author Georges Simenon
 The Strangers in the House (film), a 1942 French drama film based on the novel